Luis de la Fuente Castillo (born 21 June 1961) is a Spanish football manager and former professional player who played as a left-back. He is the manager of the Spain national team.

He amassed La Liga totals of 254 matches and six goals over 13 seasons, with Athletic Bilbao and Sevilla, winning two league titles with the former including a double with the Copa del Rey in 1984.

De la Fuente began working in the Spanish youth teams in 2013, managing the under-19 team to victory in the 2015 European Championship and the under-21 side to the 2019 equivalent. He coached the Olympic team to the silver medal at the 2020 games, and took over at the seniors in 2022.

Playing career
Born in Haro, La Rioja, de la Fuente graduated from Athletic Bilbao's youth system, and made his senior debut with the reserves in 1978, in the Segunda División B. On 8 March 1981 he made his first-team – and La Liga – debut, coming on as a second-half substitute in a 0–0 away draw against Valencia CF.

De la Fuente was definitely promoted to the main squad in the summer of 1982. He scored his first professional goal on 26 March of the following year, closing the 4–0 home rout of RC Celta de Vigo.

In July 1987, de la Fuente signed for fellow top-flight club Sevilla FC, and continued to appear regularly the following campaigns. In 1991, he returned to Athletic for a 20 million pesetas fee, but was sparingly used.

De la Fuente joined Deportivo Alavés in 1993, with the side in the third tier. After one season, he retired at the age of 33.

Coaching career

Early years
De la Fuente's first managerial job was at Club Portugalete, in the regional leagues. In summer 2000 he was appointed at Segunda División B club CD Aurrerá de Vitoria, but was sacked in March of the following year in spite of a seventh place in the table.

After a spell back at Sevilla, de la Fuente returned to Athletic. Initially a manager of the reserves, he also acted as match delegate for two years before returning to his previous duties.

On 13 July 2011, de la Fuente was named Alavés coach, being dismissed on 17 October.

Spain youths
On 5 May 2013, de la Fuente was appointed at the helm of the Spain under-19 team, who won the 2015 UEFA European Championship in Greece. He became manager of the under-21 side in July 2018, after Albert Celades resigned. His first competition was the 2019 European Championship in Italy, conquered after the 1–0 final defeat of Germany in Udine.

On 8 June 2021, de la Fuente and his team filled in as the Spain senior side for a UEFA Euro 2020 warm-up against Lithuania, after the aforementioned squad had gone into isolation when Sergio Busquets tested positive for COVID-19. They won 4–0 in Leganés.

De la Fuente was also in charge of the Spanish Olympic team at the delayed 2020 games in Japan. His side won the silver medal, losing 2–1 to Brazil in the final.

Spain senior
On 8 December 2022, de la Fuente was appointed as head coach of the senior side, as Luis Enrique resigned following a round-of-16 penalty shootout elimination at the 2022 FIFA World Cup by Morocco. He was officially presented four days later, with a contract running until UEFA Euro 2024 with the option to be extended.

Managerial statistics

Honours

Player
Athletic Bilbao
La Liga: 1982–83, 1983–84
Copa del Rey: 1983–84
Supercopa de España: 1984 (automatically awarded after winning the double)

Manager
Spain U19
UEFA European Under-19 Championship: 2015

Spain U21
UEFA European Under-21 Championship: 2019

Spain U23
Summer Olympics silver medal: 2020

References

External links

1961 births
Living people
Spanish footballers
Footballers from La Rioja (Spain)
Association football defenders
La Liga players
Segunda División B players
Bilbao Athletic footballers
Athletic Bilbao footballers
Sevilla FC players
Deportivo Alavés players
Spain youth international footballers
Spain under-21 international footballers
Spain under-23 international footballers
Spanish football managers
Segunda División B managers
Athletic Bilbao B managers
Deportivo Alavés managers
Spain national under-21 football team managers
Spain national football team managers
Athletic Bilbao non-playing staff